Timothy Ritchie (born August 7, 1987) is an American athlete who competes in distance running events. Tim Ritchie placed 1st in 2:11:56 at the 2017 California International Marathon. Ritchie is also an NCAA Division I coach.

Professional

2017
Tim Ritchie placed 1st in 2:11:56 at the California International Marathon.

Major Races

Boston College
Ritchie placed 5th in 2010 Intercollegiate Association of Amateur Athletes of America 1500 meters championship final in 3:50.51 as a senior Boston College Eagles.
Ritchie placed 9th in 2010 Stanford University Invitational 5000 meters in 14:03.21.

Early life and education
Tim Ritchie placed 4th as a senior at Doherty Memorial High School at MIAA All State Cross Country Championships November 20, 2004 at Gardner Municipal Golf Course in Gardner, Massachusetts.

References

External links

Tim Ritchie at All-Athletics
Timothy Ritchie at Boston College
Timothy Ritchie – Boston College at Athletic.net

1987 births
Living people
American male middle-distance runners
Track and field athletes from Massachusetts
Sportspeople from Worcester, Massachusetts
Boston College Eagles men's cross country runners
Boston College Eagles men's track and field athletes
American male long-distance runners
21st-century American people